Anita Sobočan (born 26 May 1997) is a retired Slovenian female volleyball player who played as a wing spiker. She was part of the Slovenia women's national volleyball team. 

Sobočan competed at the 2015 Women's European Volleyball Championship.

References

External links
FIVB profile

1997 births
Living people
Sportspeople from Celje
Slovenian women's volleyball players
Wing spikers